José Toribio Medina Zavala (October 21, 1852 -  December 11, 1930) was a Chilean bibliographer, prolific writer, and historian. He is renowned for his study of colonial literature in Chile, printing in Spanish America and large bibliographies such as the Biblioteca Hispano-Americana. (7 Vol., 1898-1907.)

Biography
Jose Toribio Medina was born in Santiago, Chile. He was the eldest son of José del Pilar Medina y Valderrama and Mariana Zavala y Almeida, a woman of Basque descent. His father was a lawyer, and he was constantly traveling due to his position as a magistrate. For this reason, Medina spent his childhood in different cities like Santiago, Talca, and Valparaiso. At the age of thirteen, he returned to Santiago to support his father who had lost the use of his legs.
Later on, Medina joined the Instituto Nacional General José Miguel Carrera under the direction of the great historian Diego Barros Arana. Then he studied law at the University of Chile, graduating as a lawyer on March 26, 1873. His first publication, when a very young man, was a metrical translation of Henry Wadsworth Longfellow's Evangeline. At twenty-two he was appointed the secretary to the legation at Lima, Peru. After his return, he published a history of Chilean literature (1878), and a work upon the aboriginal tribes (1884). In 1879, he contributed to Chile's war effort against Peru and Bolivia with the invention of an improved manufacturing method of cartridges. He was appointed military judge of Tarapacá in 1880 as a result of his efforts.

In this latter year, he was appointed the secretary of legation in Spain, and availed himself of the opportunity of examining the treasures of the old Spanish libraries.  These researches, repeated on subsequent visits to Spain, and also to France and England, enriched him with a mass of historical and bibliographical material. Among his publications may be mentioned the Biblioteca hispano-americana, a remarkable catalogue of unedited documents relating to the Spanish discovery and colonization of Chile, including a number of articles from Martín Fernández de Navarette. Volumes II and III of this collection focus on Ferdinand Magellan, from where the recorded history of Chile starts; the Biblioteca hispano-chilena, a similar work, commenced in 1897; the standard and magnificent history of printing in the La Plata countries (1892); comprehensive works on the Inquisition in Chile, Peru and the Philippines; and the standard treatise on South American medals (1899). Prior to his death, he offered his personal library collection to the National Library of Chile (Biblioteca Nacional de Chile), which contained 30,000 rare books and 500 volumes of documents dated prior to the independence of Latin American nations.

Exhaustive study of Magellan

In  1920, the Chilean historian published a comprehensive study of Magellan containing an impressive amount of biographical information, a detailed analysis of the beginning and development of the voyage of circumnavigation, and a remarkable amount of information on the crews of the Armada de Molucca. This contained a priceless list of documentary sources and an outstanding bibliography. The title of this work is El Descubrimiento del Oceano Pacifico: Vasco Nuñez, Balboa, Hernando de Magallanes y Sus Compañeros. In the words of Tim Joyner, "Any serious study of Magellan and his enterprise must include this informative product of Medina's exhaustive archival research."

In addition, Medina produced the fullest bibliographies yet attainable of books printed at Lima, Mexico and Manila, and a number of memoirs and other minor writings.  No other man had rendered anything like the same amount of service to the literary history and bibliography of the Spanish colonies. Medina was designated "Humanist of the Americas" by members of the Pan American Union.

Additional works
He was recognized as the author, editor, and translator of approximately 282 titles (books, pamphlets, and articles). If additional works like re-editions, sections of books, pre-prints and re-prints of complete or partial works, as well posthumous studies, are included, the total number of publications exceeds 350.

Some of his published books from 1882 to 1927 consist of:

 1882: Los Aborigenes de Chile. Santiago de Chile: Imprenta Gutenberg.
 1887: Historia del Tribunal del Santo Oficio de la inquisición de Lima (1569-1820). Santiago [de Chile: Imprenta Gutenberg.
 1904: La imprenta en La Habana (1707-1810). Santiago de Chile: Imprenta Elzeviriana.
 1904: La imprenta en Lima (1584-1824). Santiago de Chile: Impreso y grabado en casa del autor. 
 1904: La imprenta en Cartagena de las Indias (1809-1820): Notas bibliográficas. Santiago de Chile: Imprenta Elzeviriana. 
 1904: La imprenta en Manila desde sus origenes hasta 1810. Santiago de Chile: Impreso y  grabado en casa del autor.
 1904: La imprenta en en [sic] Quito (1760-1818): Notas bibliográficas. Santiago de Chile: Imprenta Elzeviriana.
 1906: Diccionario biográfico colonial de Chile. Santiago de Chile: Impr. Elzeviriana.
 1908: El veneciano Sebastián Caboto: Al servicio de España y  especialmente de su proyectado viaje á las Molucas por el Estrecho de Magallanes y al  reconocimiento de la costa del continente hasta la gobernación de Pedrarias Dávila. Santiago de Chile: Impr. y encuadernación universitaria.
 1908: Los restos indígenas de Pichilemu. Santiago de Chile: Imprenta Cervantes.
 1910: La imprenta en Guatemala (1660-1821). Santiago de Chile: Impreso en casa del autor.
 1913: El descubrimiento del Océano pacífico: Vasco Núñez de Balboa, Hernando de Magallanes y sus compañeros. Santiago de Chile: Imprenta universitaria.
 1923: La literatura femenina en Chile: (notas bibliográficas y en parte críticas). Santiago de Chile: Imprenta universitaria.
 1927: En defensa de siete voces chilenas registradas en el Diccionario de la Real Academia  Española y cuya supresión se solicita por un autor nacional. Santiago de Chile: Editorial Nascimento.

See also

 Maury A. Bromsen
 Chapman, Charles E. “A ‘Recuerdo’ of José Toribio Medina.” The Hispanic American Historical Review 11, no. 4 (1931): 524–29.
 José Toribio Medina Award The executive board of the Seminar on the Acquisition of Latin American Library Materials (SALALM) established in 1981 the José Toribio Medina Award, to be made annually, if merited, in recognition of outstanding contributions by SALALM members to Latin American Studies. https://web.archive.org/web/20140329231941/http://salalm.org/about/scholarships-and-awards/jose-toribio-medina-award/
 La Biblioteca Americana José Toribio Medina In el Portal de Cultura de Chile. http://www.memoriachilena.cl/temas/index.asp?id_ut=labibliotecaamericanadejosetoribiomedina
 “Una Experiencia Bibliográfica: José Toribio Medina y Su Imprenta En La Puebla Colonial.” Bibliographica 2, no. 1 (2019): 163–96.

References

External links 

1852 births
1930 deaths
19th-century Chilean historians
20th-century Chilean historians
20th-century Chilean male writers
Chilean diplomats
Chilean male writers
Chilean people of Basque descent
Members of the Chilean Academy of Language
Chilean bibliographers
People from Santiago
Instituto Nacional General José Miguel Carrera alumni
19th-century male writers